The double-banded pygmy tyrant (Lophotriccus vitiosus) is a species of bird in the family Tyrannidae. It is found in Brazil, Colombia, Ecuador, French Guiana, Guyana, Peru, and Suriname. Its natural habitats are subtropical or tropical moist lowland forest and subtropical or tropical swampland.

Diet and hunting
Its appetite consists mainly of insects, and it known as a fly-catching bird. The double-banded pygmy tyrant perches inconspicuously in the canopy (biology) of its rain forest habitat.

References

double-banded pygmy tyrant
Birds of the Amazon Basin
Birds of the Guianas
Birds of the Colombian Amazon
Birds of the Venezuelan Amazon
Birds of the Ecuadorian Amazon
Birds of the Peruvian Amazon
double-banded pygmy tyrant
double-banded pygmy tyrant
Taxonomy articles created by Polbot